Helminthiasis, also known as worm infection, is any macroparasitic disease of humans and other animals in which a part of the body is infected with parasitic worms, known as helminths. There are numerous species of these parasites, which are broadly classified into tapeworms, flukes, and roundworms. They often live in the gastrointestinal tract of their hosts, but they may also burrow into other organs, where they induce physiological damage.

Soil-transmitted helminthiasis and schistosomiasis are the most important helminthiases, and are among the neglected tropical diseases. These group of helminthiases have been targeted under the joint action of the world's leading pharmaceutical companies and non-governmental organizations through a project launched in 2012 called the London Declaration on Neglected Tropical Diseases, which aims to control or eradicate certain neglected tropical diseases by 2020.

Helminthiasis has been found to result in poor birth outcome, poor cognitive development, poor school and work performance, poor socioeconomic development, and poverty. Chronic illness, malnutrition, and anemia are further examples of secondary effects.

Soil-transmitted helminthiases are responsible for parasitic infections in as much as a quarter of the human population worldwide. One well-known example of soil-transmitted helminthiases is ascariasis.

Types of parasitic helminths

Of all the known helminth species, the most important helminths with respect to understanding their transmission pathways, their control, inactivation and enumeration in samples of human excreta from dried feces, faecal sludge, wastewater, and sewage sludge are:
 soil-transmitted helminths, including Ascaris lumbricoides (the most common worldwide), Trichuris trichiura, Necator americanus, Strongyloides stercoralis and Ancylostoma duodenale
 Hymenolepis nana
 Taenia saginata
 Enterobius
 Fasciola hepatica
 Schistosoma mansoni
 Toxocara canis
 Toxocara cati

Helminthiases are classified as follows (the disease names end with "-sis" and the causative worms are in brackets):

Roundworm infection (nematodiasis)
 Filariasis (Wuchereria bancrofti, Brugia malayi infection)
 Onchocerciasis (Onchocerca volvulus infection)
 Soil-transmitted helminthiasis – this includes ascariasis (Ascaris lumbricoides infection), trichuriasis (Trichuris infection), and hookworm infection (includes necatoriasis and Ancylostoma duodenale infection)
 Trichostrongyliasis (Trichostrongylus spp. infection)
 Dracunculiasis (guinea worm infection)
 Baylisascaris (raccoon roundworm, may be transmitted to pets, livestock, and humans)

Tapeworm infection (cestodiasis)
 Echinococcosis (Echinococcus infection)
 Hymenolepiasis (Hymenolepis infection)
 Taeniasis/cysticercosis (Taenia infection)
 Coenurosis (T. multiceps, T. serialis, T. glomerata, and T. brauni infection)

Trematode infection (trematodiasis)
 Amphistomiasis (amphistomes infection)
 Clonorchiasis (Clonorchis sinensis infection)
 Fascioliasis (Fasciola infection)
 Fasciolopsiasis (Fasciolopsis buski infection)
 Opisthorchiasis (Opisthorchis infection)
 Paragonimiasis (Paragonimus infection)
 Schistosomiasis/bilharziasis (Schistosoma infection)

Acanthocephala infection
 Moniliformis infection

Signs and symptoms

The signs and symptoms of helminthiasis depend on a number of factors including: the site of the infestation within the body; the type of worm involved; the number of worms and their volume; the type of damage the infesting worms cause; and, the immunological response of the body. Where the burden of parasites in the body is light, there may be no symptoms.

Certain worms may cause particular constellations of symptoms. For instance, taeniasis can lead to seizures due to neurocysticercosis.

Mass and volume
In extreme cases of intestinal infestation, the mass and volume of the worms may cause the outer layers of the intestinal wall, such as the muscular layer, to tear. This may lead to peritonitis, volvulus, and gangrene of the intestine.

Immunological response
As pathogens in the body, helminths induce an immune response. Immune-mediated inflammatory changes occur in the skin, lung, liver, intestine, central nervous system, and eyes. Signs of the body's immune response may include eosinophilia, edema, and arthritis. An example of the immune response is the hypersensitivity reaction that may lead to anaphylaxis. Another example is the migration of Ascaris larvae through the bronchi of the lungs causing asthma.

Secondary effects

Immune changes

In humans, T helper cells and eosinophils respond to helminth infestation. It is well established that T helper 2 cells are the central players of protective immunity to helminths, while the roles for B cells and antibodies are context-dependent. Inflammation leads to encapsulation of egg deposits throughout the body. Helminths excrete into the intestine toxic substances after they feed. These substances then enter the circulatory and lymphatic systems of the host body.

Chronic immune responses to helminthiasis may lead to increased susceptibility to other infections such as tuberculosis, HIV, and malaria. There is conflicting information about whether deworming reduces HIV progression and viral load and increases CD4 counts in antiretroviral naive and experienced individuals, although the most recent Cochrane review found some evidence that this approach might have favorable effects.

Chronic illness 
Chronic helminthiasis may cause severe morbidity. Helminthiasis has been found to result in poor birth outcome, poor cognitive development, poor school and work performance, decreased productivity, poor socioeconomic development, and poverty.

Malnutrition
Helminthiasis may cause chronic illness through malnutrition including vitamin deficiencies, stunted growth, anemia, and protein-energy malnutrition. Worms compete directly with their hosts for nutrients, but the magnitude of this effect is likely minimal as the nutritional requirements of worms is relatively small. In pigs and humans, Ascaris has been linked to lactose intolerance and vitamin A, amino acid, and fat malabsorption. Impaired nutrient uptake may result from direct damage to the intestinal mucosal wall or from more subtle changes such as chemical imbalances and changes in gut flora. Alternatively, the worms’ release of protease inhibitors to defend against the body's digestive processes may impair the breakdown of other nutrients. In addition, worm induced diarrhoea may shorten gut transit time, thus reducing absorption of nutrients.

Malnutrition due to worms can give rise to anorexia. A study of 459 children in Zanzibar revealed spontaneous increases in appetite after deworming. Anorexia might be a result of the body's immune response and the stress of combating infection. Specifically, some of the cytokines released in the immune response to worm infestation have been linked to anorexia in animals.

Anemia
Helminths may cause iron-deficiency anemia. This is most severe in heavy hookworm infections, as Necator americanus and Ancylostoma duodenale feed directly on the blood of their hosts. Although the daily consumption of an individual worm (0.02–0.07 ml and 0.14–0.26 ml respectively) is small, the collective consumption under heavy infection can be clinically significant. Intestinal whipworm may also cause anemia. Anemia has also been associated with reduced stamina for physical labor, a decline in the ability to learn new information, and apathy, irritability, and fatigue. A study of the effect of deworming and iron supplementation in 47 students from the Democratic Republic of the Congo found that the intervention improved cognitive function. Another study found that in 159 Jamaican schoolchildren, deworming led to better auditory short-term memory and scanning and retrieval of long-term memory over a period of nine-weeks.

Cognitive changes
Malnutrition due to helminths may affect cognitive function leading to low educational performance, decreased concentration and difficulty with abstract cognitive tasks. Iron deficiency in infants and preschoolers is associated with "lower scores ... on tests of mental and motor development ... [as well as] increased fearfulness, inattentiveness, and decreased social responsiveness". Studies in the Philippines and Indonesia found a significant correlation between helminthiasis and decreased memory and fluency. Large parasite burdens, particularly severe hookworm infections, are also associated with absenteeism, under-enrollment, and attrition in school children.

Transmission
Helminths are transmitted to the final host in several ways. The most common infection is through ingestion of contaminated vegetables, drinking water, and raw or undercooked meat. Contaminated food may contain eggs of nematodes such as Ascaris, Enterobius, and Trichuris; cestodes such as Taenia, Hymenolepis, and Echinococcus; and trematodes such as Fasciola. Raw or undercooked meats are the major sources of Taenia (pork, beef and venison), Trichinella (pork and bear), Diphyllobothrium (fish), Clonorchis (fish), and Paragonimus (crustaceans). Schistosomes and nematodes such as hookworms (Ancylostoma and Necator) and Strongyloides can penetrate the skin directly.

The roundworm, Dracunculus has a complex mode of transmission: it is acquired from drinking infested water or eating frogs and fish that contain (had eaten) infected crustaceans (copepods); and can also be transmitted from infected pets (cats and dogs). Roundworms such as Brugia, Wuchereria and Onchocerca are directly transmitted by mosquitoes. In the developing world, the use of contaminated water is a major risk factor for infection. Infection can also take place through the practice of geophagy, which is not uncommon in parts of sub-Saharan Africa. Soil is eaten, for example, by children or pregnant women to counteract a real or perceived deficiency of minerals in their diet.

Diagnosis

Specific helminths can be identified through microscopic examination of their eggs (ova) found in faecal samples. The number of eggs is measured in units of eggs per gram. However, it does not quantify mixed infections, and in practice, is inaccurate for quantifying the eggs of schistosomes and soil-transmitted helminths. Sophisticated tests such as serological assays, antigen tests, and molecular diagnosis are also available; however, they are time-consuming, expensive and not always reliable.

Prevention
Disrupting the cycle of the worm will prevent infestation and re-infestation. Prevention of infection can largely be achieved by addressing the issues of WASH—water, sanitation and hygiene. The reduction of open defecation is particularly called for, as is stopping the use of human waste as fertilizer.

Further preventive measures include adherence to appropriate food hygiene, wearing of shoes, regular deworming of pets, and the proper disposal of their feces.

Scientists are also searching for a vaccine against helminths, such as a hookworm vaccine.

Treatment

Medications 

Broad-spectrum benzimidazoles (such as albendazole and mebendazole) are the first line treatment of intestinal roundworm and tapeworm infections. Macrocyclic lactones (such as ivermectin) are effective against adult and migrating larval stages of nematodes. Praziquantel is the drug of choice for schistosomiasis, taeniasis, and most types of food-borne trematodiases. Oxamniquine is also widely used in mass deworming programmes. Pyrantel is commonly used for veterinary nematodiasis. Artemisinins and derivatives are proving to be candidates as drugs of choice for trematodiasis.

Mass deworming 

In regions where helminthiasis is common, mass deworming treatments may be performed, particularly among school-age children, who are a high-risk group. Most of these initiatives are undertaken by the World Health Organization (WHO) with positive outcomes in many regions. Deworming programs can improve school attendance by 25 percent. Although deworming improves the health of an individual, outcomes from mass deworming campaigns, such as reduced deaths or increases in cognitive ability, nutritional benefits, physical growth, and performance, are uncertain or not apparent.

Surgery 

If complications of helminthiasis, such as intestinal obstruction occur, emergency surgery may be required. Patients who require non-emergency surgery, for instance for removal of worms from the biliary tree, can be pre-treated with the anthelmintic drug albendazole.

Epidemiology
Areas with the highest prevalence of helminthiasis are tropical and subtropical areas including sub-Saharan Africa, central and east Asia, and the Americas.

Neglected tropical diseases 
Some types of helminthiases are classified as neglected tropical diseases. They include:
 Soil-transmitted helminthiases
 Roundworm infections such as lymphatic filariasis, dracunculiasis, and onchocerciasis
 Trematode infections, such as schistosomiasis, and food-borne trematodiases, including fascioliasis, clonorchiasis, opisthorchiasis, and paragonimiasis
 Tapeworm infections such as cysticercosis, taeniasis, and echinococcosis

Prevalence 
The soil-transmitted helminths (A. lumbricoides, T. trichiura, N. americanus, A. duodenale), schistosomes, and filarial worms collectively infect more than a quarter of the human population worldwide at any one time, far surpassing HIV and malaria together. Schistosomiasis is the second most prevalent parasitic disease of humans after malaria.

In 2014–15, the WHO estimated that approximately 2 billion people were infected with soil-transmitted helminthiases, 249 million with schistosomiasis, 56 million people with food-borne trematodiasis, 120 million with lymphatic filariasis, 37 million people with onchocerciasis, and 1 million people with echinococcosis. Another source estimated a much higher figure of 3.5 billion infected with one or more soil-transmitted helminths.

In 2014, only 148 people were reported to have dracunculiasis because of a successful eradication campaign for that particular helminth, which is easier to eradicate than other helminths as it is transmitted only by drinking contaminated water.

Because of their high mobility and lower standards of hygiene, school-age children are particularly vulnerable to helminthiasis. Most children from developing nations will have at least one infestation. Multi-species infections are very common.

The most common intestinal parasites in the United States are Enterobius vermicularis, Giardia lamblia, Ancylostoma duodenale, Necator americanus, and Entamoeba histolytica.

Variations within communities 
Even in areas of high prevalence, the frequency and severity of infection is not uniform within communities or families. A small proportion of community members harbour the majority of worms, and this depends on age. The maximum worm burden is at five to ten years of age, declining rapidly thereafter. Individual predisposition to helminthiasis for people with the same sanitation infrastructure and hygiene behavior is thought to result from differing immunocompetence, nutritional status, and genetic factors. Because individuals are predisposed to a high or a low worm burden, the burden reacquired after successful treatment is proportional to that before treatment.

Disability-adjusted life years 
It is estimated that intestinal nematode infections cause 5 million disability-adjusted life years (DALYS) to be lost, of which hookworm infections account for more than 3 million DALYS and ascaris infections more than 1 million. There are also signs of progress: The Global Burden of Disease Study published in 2015 estimates a 46 percent (59 percent when age standardised) reduction in years lived with disability (YLD) for the 13-year time period from 1990 to 2013 for all intestinal/nematode infections, and even a 74 percent (80 percent when age standardised) reduction in YLD from ascariasis.

Deaths
As many as 135,000 die annually from soil transmitted helminthiasis.

The 1990–2013 Global Burden of Disease Study estimated 5,500 direct deaths from schistosomiasis, while more than 200,000 people were estimated in 2013 to die annually from causes related to schistosomiasis. Another 20 million have severe consequences from the disease. It is the most deadly of the neglected tropical diseases.

See also 
 Kato technique

References

External links 

 Information at WHO
 European Commission
 Center for Disease Control and Prevention
 Global Atlas of Helminth Infections

Helminthiases
Foodborne illnesses
Ascaridida
Tropical diseases
Conditions diagnosed by stool test
Intestinal infectious diseases
Abdominal pain
Sanitation